John Walker (1855 – 1927) was a British philatelist who signed the Roll of Distinguished Philatelists in 1921.

References

British philatelists
1855 births
1927 deaths
Signatories to the Roll of Distinguished Philatelists